The 1900 New York state election was held on November 6, 1900, to elect the governor, the lieutenant governor, the Secretary of State, the state comptroller, the attorney general, the state treasurer and the state engineer, as well as all members of the New York State Assembly and the New York State Senate.

History
The Socialist Labor state convention met on June 8, 1900, at 6, Reade Street in Manhattan. Hugo Voght, of New York City, was chairman. They nominated Charles H. Corregan for governor; Leander A. Armstrong, of Buffalo, for lieutenant governor; Joseph H. Sweeney, of Westchester County, for Secretary of State; J. E. Alexander, of Albany, for treasurer; Eustis Ebert, of New York City, for attorney general; A. S. Brown, of New York City, for comptroller; and John E. Wallace, of Troy, for state engineer.

Delegates of the Socialist Democratic Party f New York and the seceding faction of the Socialist Labor Party met in state convention on June 16 at the Labor Lyceum in Brooklyn, and merged to form the Social Democratic Party of New York. V. S. Wirth, of Patchogue, was Temporary Chairman until the election of Morris Hillquit as Permanent Chairman. They nominated Benjamin Hanford for governor; William Butscher for lieutenant governor; Philip Jackson for Secretary of State; Eugene V. Brewster, of New York City, for attorney general; Frank Sieverman, of Rochester, for comptroller; Leonard D. Abbott, of New York City, for treasurer; and Henry Stahl, of New York City, for state engineer.

The Prohibition state convention met on July 24 at the Summit Park near Utica, New York. Henry W. Wilbur, the 1898 nominee for Secretary of State, was Temporary Chairman. They nominated William T. Wardwell, of New York City for governor; Albert J. Rumsey, of Batavia, for lieutenant governor; Joseph V. Baker, of Gouverneur, for Secretary of State; Mason N. Weed, of Montour Falls, for comptroller; Fred W. Hewitt, of Granville, for treasurer; Dexter D. Dorn, of Jamestown, for attorney general; and Emmett F. Smith, of Patchogue, for state engineer.

The Republican state convention met on September 4 and 5 at Saratoga Springs, New York. Nevada Stranahan was permanent chairman. Benjamin B. Odell, Jr., the Chairman of the Republican State Committee and chief lieutenant of boss Thomas C. Platt, was nominated for governor after his name was proposed by Ex-Governor Frank S. Black and a roll call in which all 971 votes were cast for the only candidate. Odell was chosen to succeed the incumbent Theodore Roosevelt who had been nominated earlier that year for U.S. Vice President. All other incumbent state officers were re-nominated by acclamation. Comptroller Morgan died on the day the nominations were made. On September 13, the Republican State Committee met at the Fifth Avenue Hotel, and substituted Erastus C. Knight on the ticket.

The Democratic state convention met on September 11 and 12 at Saratoga Springs. Patrick H. McCarren was Temporary Chairman until the choice of George Raines as Permanent Chairman. John B. Stanchfield, Richard Croker's candidate, was nominated for governor on the first ballot defeating Bird Sim Coler who had been proposed by David B. Hill. (vote: Stanchfield 294, Coler 154, Mackey 1). The other candidates were nominated by acclamation.

Result
The whole Republican ticket was elected.

The incumbents Woodruff, McDonough, Davies, Jaeckel and Bond were re-elected.

All five parties maintained automatic ballot status (necessary 10,000 votes).

Notes

Sources
The tickets: THE TICKETS IN THE STATES in NYT on October 21, 1900
The Democratic candidates: SKETCHES OF THE NOMINEES in NYT on September 13, 1900
Result: THE STATE OFFICIAL VOTE in NYT on December 13, 1900
Result in New York County: NEW YORK COUNTY'S VOTE in NYT on November 28, 1900
Result: The Tribune Almanac
The New York Red Book 1901

See also
New York gubernatorial elections

1900
 
New York